The 2009 IIHF World Women's U18 Championship Division I tournament was held in Chambéry, France, from 28 December 2008 to 2 January 2009. This was the first junior female Division I ice hockey world championship in history.

Final standings

 is promoted to the Top Division of the 2010 IIHF World Women's U18 Championship.

Results

All times are local (CET – UTC+01:00).

References

IIHF World Women's U18 Championship – Division I
World
World
International ice hockey competitions hosted by France